The Jewish Cemetery of New Bedford, Massachusetts is located in the far north of the city, on Old Plainville Road, just north of New Bedford Regional Airport. The cemetery was established in 1898 as the principal burying ground for two congregations, Chesed Shel Emes and Ahavath Achim. It is the second Jewish cemetery in the city; the first, a small section of Peckham West Cemetery, was filled up in the 1890s. Entrances to the cemetery are marked by stone posts with bronze plaques. There is also the Temple Sinai section that sits in the grounds of the New Bedford airport that was accessible from the Old Plainville Road but is now blocked off.

The cemetery was listed on the National Register of Historic Places in 2014.  It is noted for its significance with the growth of the Jewish community in New Bedford, and for its encapsulation of changing Jewish funerary customs, and their difference from those of other ethnic and religious groups.

See also
 National Register of Historic Places listings in New Bedford, Massachusetts

References

Cemeteries on the National Register of Historic Places in Massachusetts
Cemeteries in Bristol County, Massachusetts
Buildings and structures in New Bedford, Massachusetts
1898 establishments in Massachusetts
Jewish cemeteries in Massachusetts
National Register of Historic Places in New Bedford, Massachusetts
Cemeteries established in the 1890s